The Empire Strykers are an American professional indoor soccer team based in Ontario, California. Founded in 2013 as the Ontario Fury, the team made its debut in the Professional Arena Soccer League at the start of the 2013–14 season. The team plays its home games at the Toyota Arena under the leadership of general manager, head coach,  Jimmy Nordberg. As of May 2014, the league is known as the Major Arena Soccer League. The team re-branded to its current name in 2022.

History
In late May 2013, the owners of the now-dormant Anaheim Bolts announced that they would instead field a new PASL team at the Citizens Business Bank Arena in Ontario, California. The team held its first open tryouts on June 28–29.

On July 25, team president Bernie Lilavois announced that "Ontario Fury" was chosen from over 500 fan-submitted entries in a name-the-team contest. The name, logo, and team colors all reflect the passion of local soccer fans and the "powerful elements" of heat and wind that characterize the Inland Empire climate.

On September 17, 2022 the team was rebranded “Empire Strykers”.

Ontario Fury II
In 2017, the club started a developmental team known as Ontario Fury II that play in the new Major Arena Soccer League 2 (or M2, for short).

Year-by-year 

* No fans due to the COVID-19 pandemic.

The Fury began exhibition play on October 26 with a 16–8 win over Toros Mexico. They defeated the Dallas Sidekicks 6–5 in their first regular season game on November 10. The team then suffered roster changes and struggled on the field.

Playoffs

* Fans only allowed in the Ron Newman Cup due to the COVID-19 pandemic, in which the Fury hosted both games and the mini-game.

Personnel

Active players
As of March 9, 2023.

Inactive players

Staff
  Jimmy Nordberg –  Head coach
  Troy McKerrell – Assistant coach

References

External links
Empire Strykers official website
Major Arena Soccer League official website

Major Arena Soccer League teams
Professional Arena Soccer League teams
2013 establishments in California
Association football clubs established in 2013
Indoor soccer clubs in the United States
Sports in Ontario, California
Sports in San Bernardino County, California
Sports in the Inland Empire
Soccer clubs in California